Thomas Douglas Watt (21 December 1891 — 13 June 1949) was a Scottish first-class cricketer and cricket administrator.

Watt was born at Edinburgh in December 1891. He was educated at George Watson's College. A club cricketer for Watsonians, he made his debut for Scotland in first-class cricket against Ireland at Dublin in 1912, with Watt making a further appearance against Ireland prior to the First World War. Following the war, he made a further nine first-class appearances, the last of which came in 1924. Playing as a right-arm medium pace bowler, he took 21 wickets at an average of 39.09, with best figures of 3 for 47. As a lower middle order batsman, he scored 149 runs in his eleven matches at an average of 10.64, with a highest score of 23. Watt later served as honorary secretary of the Scottish Cricket Union from 1925 to 1947. A solicitor by profession, he died suddenly at Edinburgh in June 1949.

References

External links
 

1891 births
1949 deaths
Cricketers from Edinburgh
People educated at George Watson's College
Scottish solicitors
Scottish cricketers
Scottish cricket administrators